The consensus 1978 College Basketball All-American team, as determined by aggregating the results of four major All-American teams.  To earn "consensus" status, a player must win honors from a majority of the following teams: the Associated Press, the USBWA, The United Press International and the National Association of Basketball Coaches.

1978 Consensus All-America team

Individual All-America teams

AP Honorable Mention:

 Clyde Austin, NC State
 James Bailey, Rutgers
 Gene Banks, Duke
 Ron Baxter, Texas
 Roosevelt Bouie, Syracuse
 Winford Boynes, San Francisco
 James Bradley, Memphis State
 Michael Brooks, La Salle
 Marty Byrnes, Syracuse
 Bruce Campbell, Providence
 Ron Carter, VMI
 Bill Cartwright, San Francisco
 Pat Cummings, Cincinnati
 Harry Davis, Florida State
 Marvin Delph, Arkansas
 Sherman Dillard, James Madison
 Sammy Drummer, Georgia Tech
 John Duren, Georgetown
 John Gerdy, Davidson
 Mike Gminski, Duke
 Steve Grant, Manhattan
 Darrell Griffith, Louisville
 James Hardy, San Francisco
 Keith Herron, Villanova
 Marc Iavaroni, Virginia
 Derrick Jackson, Georgetown
 Frank Johnson, Wake Forest
 George Johnson, St. John's
 Lynbert Johnson, Wichita State
 Marvin Johnson, New Mexico
 Jeff Judkins, Utah
 Jim Krivacs, Texas
 Jeff Lamp, Virginia
 Billy Lewis, Illinois State
 John Long, Detroit
 John Lowenhaupt, William & Mary
 Oliver Mack, East Carolina
 Kyle Macy, Kentucky
 Lew Massey, Charlotte
 Robert Miller, Cincinnati
 Mike Mitchell, Auburn
 Johnny Moore, Texas
 Jonathan Moore, Furman
 Lowes Moore, West Virginia
 Calvin Natt, Northeast Louisiana
 Mike O'Koren, North Carolina
 Ron Perry, Holy Cross
 Roger Phegley, Bradley
 Mike Phillips, Kentucky
 Micheal Ray Richardson, Montana
 Mike Russell, Texas Tech
 Frankie Sanders, Southern
 Greg Sanders, St. Bonaventure
 Mike Santos, Utah State
 Purvis Short, Jackson State
 Arthur Snipe, South Carolina State
 Jim Spanarkel, Duke
 Henry Taylor, Texas–Pan American
 Reggie Theus, UNLV
 Andrew Toney, Southwestern Louisiana
 Raymond Townsend, UCLA
 Greg Tynes, Seton Hall
 Dean Uthoff, Iowa State
 Darnell Valentine, Kansas
 Ren Watson, VCU
 Jerome Whitehead, Marquette
 Hawkeye Whitney, NC State
 Duck Williams, Notre Dame
 Ken Williams, North Texas
 Rick Wilson, Louisville
 Gary Winton, Army

See also
 1977–78 NCAA Division I men's basketball season

References

NCAA Men's Basketball All-Americans
All-Americans